The National Petroleum Staff Association is a trade union in Trinidad and Tobago. It organises senior staff in the state owned National Petroleum company.

See also

 List of trade unions

Trade unions in Trinidad and Tobago
Energy organizations